Lewisburg Historic District may refer to:

 Lewisburg Historic District (Covington, Kentucky), listed on the National Register of Historic Places (NRHP) in Kenton County
Lewisburg Archeological District, Diana, New York, a historic district listed on the NRHP in New York
 Lewisburg Historic District (Lewisburg, Pennsylvania), listed on the NRHP in Union County
Lewisburg Avenue Historic District, Franklin, Tennessee, listed on the NRHP in Tennessee
 Lewisburg Historic District (Lewisburg, West Virginia), listed on the NRHP in Greenbrier County

See also
Lewiston Historic District (disambiguation)